De Karpendonkse Hoeve is a restaurant located in Eindhoven in the Netherlands. It is a fine dining restaurant that has been awarded one Michelin star every year since 1979.

Head chef is Peter Koehn. In 1980, Koehn took over from Peter Willems, who had earned the Michelin star in 1979. In September 2017, Koehn announced his upcoming retirement and that the second head chef Rob van der Veeken would take over.

Present owner is Ingrid van Eeghem. In 2004 she took over the ownership of her father Leo van Eeghem, who had founded the restaurant in 1973.

Van Eeghen regularly invites other chefs to show off their cooking qualities. Guest chefs include Paula DaSilva, runner up of Hell's Kitchen (U.S. season 5) and the Japanese chef Katsumasa Kitajima, known for kaiseki ryōri cuisine.

In 2007, De Karpendonkse Hoeve celebrated their 30th Michelin star in a row and in 2014 their 35th.

See also
List of Michelin starred restaurants in the Netherlands

References 

Restaurants in the Netherlands
Michelin Guide starred restaurants in the Netherlands
De Karpendonkse Hoeve
De Karpendonkse Hoeve
De Karpendonkse Hoeve